Boy for You is the first solo album recorded by Astrid Williamson and her Goya Dress colleagues Terry de Castro & Simon Pearson on bass & drums but following record company pressure, Goya Dress broke up and the album released under the name  'Astrid' in 1998.

The album was produced by Malcolm Burn, who has previously worked with Daniel Lanois, The Neville Brothers, Iggy Pop, Peter Gabriel, Patti Smith, Midnight Oil, and Shaun Colvin. Originally released on Nude Records, the album was reissued on One Little Indian/Incantation Records in 2006.

The song "If I Loved You" was featured on the soundtrack to Gregory's Two Girls, the 1999 sequel to Bill Forsyth's cult 1981 classic Gregory's Girl. The track was also recorded by Abra Moore, retitled 'Someone Else's Mess' and featured on the 'Serving Sara' film soundtrack.

Track listing 
 I Am The Boy For You
 Everyone's Waiting
 What Do You ...
 World At Your Feet
 Sing For Me
 Someone
 Hozanna
 If I Loved You
 Outside
 Say What You Mean

Personnel 
 Vocals – Astrid Williamson
 Bass – Terry de Castro
 Drums – Simon Pearson
 12 string Guitar on 'If I Loved You' – Bill Dillon 
 Trumpet – Gerard Presencer
 Assistant Engineer – Zak Boulos
 Produced, engineered, additional instrumentation & mixed by Malcolm Burn
 Cover photography by Rick Guest
 All songs written by Astrid Williamson except 'Outside' by Malcolm Burn

References 

1998 debut albums
Astrid Williamson albums